Bilikis Abiodun Otunla (born June 12, 1994) is a Nigerian weightlifter. She competed in the 2015 African Games and she won gold medals in the women's 69 kg category - Clean and jerk 1ST (Gold), Women's 69 – 75 kg category – Trekken 1ST (Gold) and Women's 69 – 75 kg – Total Gold She had also participated in the 2016, 2018 and 2019 of the African Games competitions winning gold at all of them except the 2019 which she was suspended after her win as a result of a failed anti-doping test, and the gold medal was not awarded to her. In 2019 she was banned until 2027 by the International Weightlifting Federation after testing positive for metenolone and metenolone metabolites.

Competition participated 
Please note, major results of Bilikis Abiodun Otunla may be incomplete, you can help complete it.
 2019 African Championships
2019 - African Championships - Women's -81 kg - Total :  1st (Gold)
2019 - African Championships - Women's -81 kg - Snatch :  1st
2019 - African Championships - Women's -81 kg - Clean & Jerk :  1st
 
 2018 World Championships
Women's -76 kg - Clean & Jerk 12
Women's -76 kg – Snatch 14
Women's -76 kg – Total 14
 2017 COMMONWEALTH & OCEANIA CHAMPIONSHIPS

 2016 - African Championships
2016 - African Championships - Women's 69 – 75 kg :   Gold
 
 2015 African Games
Women's 69 – 75 kg - Clean and jerk 1ST
Women's 69 – 75 kg – Trekken 1ST
Women's 69 – 75 kg – Total Gold

Controversy 
Bilikis Abiodun Otunla, who won gold in the -81 kg category at the 2019 African Weightlifting Championships was suspended following her failed anti-doping test, a result that saw her violating the anti-doping rule. However the International Weightlifting Federation (IWF) revealed a public disclosure on reports about the sample of her test,  which says; “An Adverse Analytical Finding for metenolone and metenolone metabolite -1-methylene-5α-androstane-3α-ol-17-one (S1.1 Anabolic agents). As a consequence, the Athlete is provisionally suspended in view of a potential anti-doping rule violation. In any case, where it is determined that the Athlete did not commit an anti-doping rule violation, the relevant decision will also be published. IWF will not make any further comments on the case until it is closed.”

References 

1994 births
Living people
Nigerian female weightlifters
African Games gold medalists for Nigeria
African Games medalists in weightlifting
Competitors at the 2015 African Games
20th-century Nigerian women
21st-century Nigerian women